Petty and grand corruption is a growing problem within Morocco. A leaked report by a US diplomat stated in 2009 that corruption had become much more institutionalized under King Mohammed VI, and that the royal family had been using public institutions to coerce and solicit bribes.

On Transparency International's 2022 Corruption Perceptions Index, Morocco scored 38 on a scale from 0 ("highly corrupt") to 100 ("very clean"). When ranked by score, Morocco ranked 94th among the 180 countries in the Index, where the country ranked first is perceived to have the most honest public sector.  For comparison, the best score was 90 (ranked 1), the worst score was 12 (ranked 180), and the average score was 43.

Corruption is also identified by businesses as a large obstacle for investment in Morocco. Public procurement is an area with a high level of corruption, and government contracts are often awarded to well-connected companies. Corruption committed by highly influential persons are rarely prosecuted.

See also 
 International Anti-Corruption Academy
 Group of States Against Corruption
 International Anti-Corruption Day
 ISO 37001 Anti-bribery management systems
 United Nations Convention against Corruption
 OECD Anti-Bribery Convention
 Transparency International

References

External links
Morocco Corruption Profile from the Business Anti-Corruption Portal

 
Morocco
Politics of Morocco
Morocco